John Algeo (1930–2019) was an American academic, trained as a linguist, and the author of one of the standard American textbooks on the history of the English language.

He was also a Theosophist and a Freemason. He was the Vice President of the Theosophical Society Adyar and, was a Professor Emeritus of English at the University of Georgia.

Biography
Algeo was born in St Louis, Missouri. He joined the army and served in the Korean War and became a sergeant. He married Adele Silbereisen in 1958. He earned a Bachelor of Education degree from the University of Miami in 1955, and Master of Arts (1957) and Doctor of Philosophy (1960) degrees from the University of Florida. He was an instructor at Florida State University from 1959 to 1961. He returned to the University of Florida in 1961 as an assistant professor of English, becoming an associate professor in 1966, assistant dean of the graduate school in 1969 and a full professor in 1970. Algeo moved to the University of Georgia in 1971 as a professor of English. He was chair of the English department from 1975 until 1979. He became professor emeritus in 1994.

John Algeo was national president of the Theosophical Society America in 1993, president of the American Dialect Society, 1979, president of the Dictionary Society of North America, 1995-97, president of the American Name Society, 1984, editor of American Speech, 1969-82, and editor of Quest magazine, 1995.

John Algeo died October 13, 2019, in Bowling Green, Kentucky.

Books

Linguistics and philology
 With John Pyles.
 With Ralph Williams, Judith Patton Hudson and Margaret Farcas.

 With Randolph Quirk and Sidney Greenbaum.

 Editor. 
 Editor, with Adele S. Algeo.
 Editor.
 With Carmen Acevedo Butcher.

Theosophy

 Editor.
 With Shirley Nicholson.

References

1930 births
American Theosophists
2019 deaths
Linguists from the United States
University of Miami School of Education alumni
University of Florida alumni
University of Florida faculty
University of Georgia faculty